The House of Courtenay is a medieval noble house, with branches in France, England and the Holy Land. One branch of the Courtenays became a Royal House of the Capetian Dynasty, cousins of the Bourbons and the Valois, and achieved the title of Latin Emperor of Constantinople.

Origin
The house was founded by Athon, the first lord of Courtenay in France. Athon took advantage of the succession crisis in the Duchy of Burgundy between Otto-William, Duke of Burgundy and King Robert II of France to capture a piece of land for himself, where he established his own seigneury (lordship), taking his surname from the town he founded and fortified.

Athon was succeeded by his son Joscelin, who had three sons: Miles, who was Lord of Courtenay after him; Prince Joscelin, who joined the First Crusade and became Count of Edessa; and Geoffrey, who also fought in the Holy Land and died there.

In the 12th century, Reginald de Courtenay (d.1190), son of Milo de Courtenay (d.1127), quarrelled with King Louis VII of France and moved to England: His French lands were forfeit, and passed, with his daughter Elizabeth, to Louis' brother Peter, who took the name "Peter de Courtenay". His son, Peter II, later became Latin Emperor of Constantinople.

The Crusader house of Courtenay
Joscelin de Courtenay arrived in Outremer with the third wave of the First Crusade and proved himself capable, becoming in turn Lord of Turbessel, Prince of Galilee, and (in 1118) Count of Edessa, succeeding his cousin King Baldwin II of Jerusalem.
He was succeeded in 1131 by his son, Joscelin II, but the county was lost in 1144, and Joscelin died in captivity in 1159.
His son, Joscelin III, was the titular Count, while his sister, Agnes, became Queen of Jerusalem by marriage to King Amalric.

Amalric's second wife, Maria Komnene, Queen of Jerusalem, became the wife of Balian of Ibelin, of the House of Ibelin. Joscelin III died in the 1190s, succeeded by two daughters; his last property was passed by them to the Teutonic Order. His sister, Agnes of Courtenay, was mother to two monarchs, King Baldwin the Leper and Queen Sibylla. She later married Hugh of Ibelin, brother of Balian, who surrendered Jerusalem to Saladin in 1187.

The English House of Courtenay

 
Reginald de Courtenay's grandson, Robert de Courtenay (d.1242), feudal baron of Okehampton, Devon (in right of his mother Hawise de Curcy (d.1219),) married Mary de Redvers, daughter and heiress of William de Redvers, 5th Earl of Devon (d.1217), seated at Tiverton Castle and Plympton Castle in Devon. On the death of Isabel de Forz, suo jure 8th Countess of Devon in 1293 (the sister and heiress of Baldwin de Redvers, 7th Earl of Devon (1236–1262)) she was succeeded by her cousin Hugh de Courtenay, 1st/9th Earl of Devon (d.1340), feudal baron of Okehampton, the great-grandson of Robert de Courtenay (d.1242). 

His title of Earl of Devon was not however officially recognised until 1335, and it remains unclear whether it was a new creation or a continuation of the Redvers title, with different modern sources giving him as either 1st or 9th Earl of Devon. The senior line seated at Tiverton, Okehampton and Plympton, died out in 1471 during the Wars of the Roses, but the Earldom was recreated three more times in 1485, 1511 and 1553 for cousins, all descended from the eldest son of the 2nd/10th Earl. William Courtenay, 1st Earl of Devon (1475–1511), would marry Princess Catherine of the Royal House of York, a younger daughter of King Edward IV, bringing the Earls of Devon very close to the line of succession to the English throne. 

On the death of Edward Courtenay, 1st Earl of Devon (1527–1556), unmarried at Padua in 1556, the subject of the final creation of 1553, the title was considered extinct until declared in 1831 by the House of Lords to have been merely dormant, when it was confirmed to William Courtenay, Viscount Courtenay (1768–1835) (of the surviving junior line seated at Powderham Castle in Devon, descended from the fourth son of the 2nd/10th Earl) who became the 9th Earl of Devon. The family survives in the male line and is headed by Charles Courtenay, 19th Earl of Devon, of Powderham.

The Capetian House of Courtenay

Reginald de Courtenay's daughter, Elizabeth, was given in marriage, together with his forfeited French lands, by the French Capetian King Louis VII with whom he had quarreled, to his youngest brother Peter of France (d.1183), henceforth known as Peter I of Courtenay. Peter and Elizabeth's descendants were members of the Capetian House of Courtenay, a cadet branch of the House of Capet, the French Royal House. Their descendants acquired through marriage the County of Namur and the Latin Empire of Constantinople. This branch became extinct in the male line in 1733, with the name Courtenay passing on to the Princely House of Bauffremont. Notable members of the Bauffremonts became Princes of the Holy Roman Empire, Imperial Count by Napoleon Bonaparte and Duke by Louis XVIII.

Claim to French royal status
The House of Bourbon, which acquired the French throne with the accession of Henry IV of France in 1589, was another cadet branch of the Capetian dynasty. Under the Salic law, males descended in male line from Hugh Capet are princes of the blood—i.e., they have the right to succeed to the French throne in the event that the male line of the royal family and of more senior princes die out. Hence, the then-impoverished Capetian House of Courtenay, being agnatic descendants of Louis VI of France, sought to be acknowledged as "princes du sang" (Princes of the Blood Royal) and "cousins to the king", two titles normally reserved for the members of the royal family and prized for the seats at the Royal Council and the Parliament of Paris that they conferred upon its holders.

Moreover, the Bourbons had difficulty producing surviving male dynasts in quantity until the mid-17th century. The Capetian Courtenays were, after their cousins the Bourbons, the most senior surviving agnatic branch of the House of Capet, and under strict application of Salic law the Crown would pass to them should the Bourbons fall extinct.

Three Bourbon kings in a row—Henry IV, Louis XIII and Louis XIV—turned down their petitions. That the Bourbon monarchs confined the French royalty to the descendants of Louis IX is evidenced by the Treaty of Montmartre (1662) which named the non-Capetian House of Lorraine as the next in line to the French throne after the Bourbons, thus bypassing the Courtenay branch, a Capetian family. Although the Courtenays protested against this clause, their claims to the princely title were never acknowledged by the Paris Court of Accounts.

The last male member of the French Courtenays died in 1733. His niece married the marquis de Bauffremont, and their descendants assumed the title of "Prince de Courtenay" with dubious validity, which they bear to this day. The marquis de Bauffremont was made on 8 June 1757 Prince of the Holy Roman Empire (inheritable by all male-line descendants); this title was recognised in France. Bauffremont-Courtenay are also princes of Carency and dukes of Bauffremont.

Genealogy

Athon
Joscelin I of Courtenay, married 1. Hildegarde de Gâtinais (sister of Geoffrey III of Anjou), 2. Isabel de Montlhéry, daughter of Guy I of Montlhéry
Hodierna, married 
Miles of Courtenay (d.1127), married Ermengarde of Nevers
William de Courtenay
Joscelin de Courtenay
Reginald de Courtenay (d. 1190), married firstly, Hélène du Donjon, and secondly, after his move to England, Maud du Sap, d.1219, daughter of Robert FitzEdith (d.1172) (illegitimate son of King Henry I of England by Edith FitzForne).
Renaud de Courtenay (d. 1194), married Hawise de Curcy, heiress to the English feudal barony of Okehampton, Devon. 
Robert de Courtenay (d.1242) feudal baron of Okehampton, married Lady Mary de Redvers, d. of William de Redvers, 5th Earl of Devon (d.1217)
John de Courtenay (d.1274)
Hugh de Courtenay (d.1292)
Hugh de Courtenay, 9th Earl of Devon (d.1340)
(Earls of Devon)
Elizabeth de Courtenay, married Peter I of Courtenay (d.1183), son of King Louis VI of France.
 (Capetian branch)
Joscelin I, Count of Edessa, married 1. Beatrice (daughter of Constantine I of Armenia), 2. Maria of Salerno (sister of Roger of Salerno)
Joscelin II, Count of Edessa, married Beatrice
Joscelin III of Edessa, married Alice of Milly
Beatrix de Courtenay, married Otto von Botenlauben (Count of Henneberg)
Agnes, married William of La Mandelie
Agnes of Courtenay, married 1. Reginald of Marash, 2. King Amalric I of Jerusalem, 3. Hugh of Ibelin, 4. Reginald of Sidon
Isabella of Courtenay, married Prince Thoros II of Armenia
Geoffrey of Champlay

References

Bibliography
 Runciman, Steven (1951) A History of the Crusades: Vols. I-II. Cambridge University Press
 Sanders, I.J. (1960) English Baronies. Oxford
 Kenneth Setton (1969) A History of the Crusades. Univ. Wisconsin

External links
Cleaveland, Ezra. A Genealogical History of the Noble and Illustrious Family of Courtenay, Exeter, 1735

 
Courtenay
Courtenay
Courtenay